The Jackson River is a major tributary of the James River in the U.S. state of Virginia, flowing . The James River is formed by the confluence of the Jackson River and the Cowpasture River.

Course
The Jackson River rises in Highland County, Virginia, near the border of West Virginia. It flows south between Back Creek Mountain and Jack Mountain, entering Bath County, where it continues to flow south. The Jackson River is impounded by Gathright Dam in Alleghany County, creating Lake Moomaw.  From the dam, Jackson River flows south and then east through Alleghany County, through the city of Covington and the town of Clifton Forge, before joining with the Cowpasture River to create the James River.

Jackson was possibly an acquaintance of Alexander Dunlap, the first white settler on the Calfpasture River.

See also
 List of Virginia rivers

References

Tributaries of the James River
Rivers of Virginia
Rivers of Bath County, Virginia
Rivers of Highland County, Virginia
Rivers of Alleghany County, Virginia